A remake is a film, television series, video game, song or similar form of entertainment that is based upon and retells the story of an earlier production in the same medium—e.g., a "new version of an existing film". A remake tells the same story as the original but uses a different cast, and may alter the theme or change the story's setting. A similar but not synonymous term is reimagining, which indicates a greater discrepancy between, for example, a movie and the movie it is based on.

Film

A film remake uses an earlier movie as its main source material, rather than returning to the earlier movie's source material. 2001's Ocean's Eleven is a remake of 1960's Ocean's 11, while 1989's Batman is a re-interpretation of the comic book source material which also inspired 1966's Batman. In 1998, Gus Van Sant produced an almost shot-for-shot remake of Alfred Hitchcock's 1960 film Psycho.

With the exception of shot-for-shot remakes, most remakes make significant changes in character, plot, genre, and theme. For example, the 1968 film The Thomas Crown Affair is centered on a bank robbery, while its 1999 remake involves the theft of a valuable painting. The 1999 remake of The Mummy was viewed primarily as a "reimagining" in a different genre (adventure). 

Similarly, when the 1969 film The Italian Job was remade in 2003, few aspects were carried over. Another example is the 1932 film Scarface which was remade in 1983 starring Al Pacino; the 1932 version is about the illegal alcohol trade, while the characters in the 1983 version are cocaine smugglers.

Sometimes a remake is made by the same director. For example, Yasujirō Ozu's black-and-white A Story of Floating Weeds was remade into the color Floating Weeds. Hitchcock remade his 1934 black-and-white The Man Who Knew Too Much in color in 1956. Tick Tock Tuckered, released in 1944, was a color remake of Porky's Badtime Story, released in 1937 with Daffy Duck in Gabby Goat's role. Cecil B. DeMille managed the same thing with his 1956 remake of his silent 1923 film The Ten Commandments. In 2008, Michael Haneke made Funny Games U.S., his English-language remake of his original Funny Games (this is also an example of a shot-for-shot remake), while Martin Campbell, director of the miniseries Edge of Darkness, directed the 2010 film adaptation.

Not all remakes use the same title as the previously released version; the 1966 film Walk, Don't Run, for example, is a remake of the World War II comedy The More the Merrier. This is particularly true for films that are remade from films produced in another language such as Point of No Return (from the French ), Vanilla Sky (from the Spanish ), The Magnificent Seven (from the Japanese Seven Samurai), A Fistful of Dollars (from the Japanese Yojimbo), The Departed (from Hong Kong's Infernal Affairs), Secret in Their Eyes (from the Argentine ), Let Me In (from the Swedish Let the Right One In or ), and The Ring (from the Japanese Ring).

Remakes are rarely sequels to the original film. In this situation, essentially the remake repeats the same basic story of the original film and may even use the same title, but also contains notable plot and storyline elements indicating the two films are set in "the same universe". An example of this type of remake is the 2000 film version of Shaft, which was the second film adaptation of the original novel but was also a canon storyline sequel to the original 1971 film adaptation. The 2013 remake of Evil Dead was also a storyline sequel, featuring a post-credits cameo from Ash Williams.

The Italian film Perfect Strangers (2016) was included in the Guinness World Records as it became the most remade film in cinema history, with a total of 18 versions of the film.

Television

Remakes occur less often on television than in film, but have happened from time to time, especially in the early 21st century. Examples include Battlestar Galactica (2003), He-Man and the Masters of the Universe (2002),  (2010), V (2009), Hawaii 5-0 (2010), and Charlie's Angels (2011).

One area where television remakes are particularly common is remaking British shows for the US market or, less frequently, American shows for the UK. For example, Three's Company is an American remake of the British Man About the House: not only was the original show re-created (with very few characters or situation changes initially), but both series had spin-offs based on the Ropers (in the UK, George and Mildred, in the US, The Ropers), and both series were eventually re-tooled into series based on the male lead (in the UK, Robin's Nest, in the US, Three's a Crowd). The British sitcom Till Death Us Do Part inspired the American All in the Family, while All in the Family's spin-off Maude was remade in the UK as Nobody's Perfect.

Another example is the long-running US sitcom The Office (2005-2013), which was a remake of the 2001 BBC sitcom of the same name. The American version's pilot episode followed its British counterpart "nearly verbatim," though later episodes had their own unique plot. The American television show The Killing is an investigative crime drama based on the Danish series .

Video games

A video game remake is a game that's built from the ground up. In some cases, only models and environments are remade, while retaining the game's original code. Remakes are produced for the purpose of modernizing a game for newer hardware and new audiences. Typically, a remake of such game software shares its title, fundamental gameplay concepts, and core story elements with the original. With the advent of such notable video game remakes such as Resident Evil 2 in 2019 (followed by Resident Evil 3 in 2020) and Final Fantasy VII Remake in 2020, these strict notions are being called into question and brought into a broader perspective. This can even be seen as early as 2004 with the release of Metal Gear Solid: The Twin Snakes as that title features newer gameplay additions and voice acting.

Remakes are often made by the original developer or copyright holder, although some are made by the fan community. If created by the community, video game remakes are sometimes also called fan games and can be seen as part of the retrogaming phenomenon.

See also
 List of British television series based on American television series
 List of English-language films with previous foreign-language film versions
 Cover versions of songs

References

 
Film and video terminology
Television terminology